Mimi Jakobsen (born 19 November 1948 in Copenhagen) is a Danish former politician and government minister and secretary general of the Danish chapter of the International Save the Children Alliance. After 15 years she resigned from her position as secretary general of Save the Children Denmark on 17 June 2015.

From 1989 to 2005 she was leader of the Centre Democrats, a political party formed by her father, former Social Democrat Erhard Jakobsen, in 1973. She was Minister of Culture in the mid-1980s.

On the 21 December 2006 she announced that she joined the Social Democratic party.

External links
Save the Children profile
Kvinfo profile

References

1948 births
Living people
Members of the Folketing
Danish Culture Ministers
Government ministers of Denmark
Centre Democrats (Denmark) politicians
Politicians from Copenhagen
Women government ministers of Denmark
Women members of the Folketing
Leaders of political parties in Denmark